Oncom is one of the traditional staple foods of West Java (Sundanese) cuisine of Indonesia. There are two kinds of oncom: red oncom and black oncom. Oncom is closely related to tempeh; both are foods fermented using mold.

Usually oncom is made from the by-products from the production of other foods: soy pulp remains from making tofu, peanut press cake remains after the oil has been pressed out, cassava tailings when extracting the starch (pati singkong), coconut press cake remaining after oil has been pressed out or when coconut milk has been produced. Since oncom production uses by-products to make food, it increases the economic efficiency of food production.

Red oncom has been found to reduce the cholesterol levels of rats.

Black oncom is made by using Rhizopus oligosporus while red oncom is made by using Neurospora intermedia var. oncomensis. It is the only human food produced from Neurospora.

Toxicity

In the production of oncom, sanitation and hygiene are important to avoid contaminating the culture with bacteria or other fungi like Aspergillus flavus (which produces aflatoxin). Neurospora intermedia var. oncomensis and Rhizopus oligosporus reduce the aflatoxin produced by Aspergillus flavus. However, aflatoxin-producing molds (Aspergillus spp.) are often naturally present on peanut presscake. Furthermore, coconut presscake can harbor the very dangerous Burkholderia gladioli, which produces two highly toxic compounds – bongkrek acid and toxoflavin. William Shurtleff and Akiko Aoyagi address toxicity in their book section on oncom.

While it is known that soybeans are the best substrate for growing R. oligosporus to produce tempeh, oncom has not been as thoroughly studied; the best fermentation substrates for producing oncom are not yet known.

Cooking methods

Oncom can be prepared and cooked in various ways. It can be simply deep fried as gorengan fritters, seasoned and cooked in a banana leaf pouch as pepes, or roasted, seasoned and mixed with steamed rice as nasi tutug oncom. Oncom is also a selected fillings for comro, lontong and arem-arem rice dumplings. Comro in particular is a popular Sundanese snack, the name was an abbreviation from oncom di jero which literally means "oncom inside".

See also

 Sundanese cuisine

References

Further reading

Fermented soy-based foods
Vegetarian cuisine
Sundanese cuisine
Vegetarian dishes of Indonesia
Vegetable dishes of Indonesia